Yukio Inokuma (born 2 January 1920) was a Japanese sports shooter. He competed at the 1952 Summer Olympics, 1956 Summer Olympics and 1960 Summer Olympics.

References

External links
 

1920 births
Possibly living people
Japanese male sport shooters
Olympic shooters of Japan
Shooters at the 1952 Summer Olympics
Shooters at the 1956 Summer Olympics
Shooters at the 1960 Summer Olympics
Place of birth missing
Asian Games medalists in shooting
Shooters at the 1954 Asian Games
Shooters at the 1958 Asian Games
Asian Games gold medalists for Japan
Medalists at the 1958 Asian Games
20th-century Japanese people